The Saarlandliga (English: Saarland league) is currently the sixth tier of the German football league system in the German federal state of Saarland. It was a new league, introduced at the end of the 2008-09 season.

In the past, the term Saarlandliga has unofficially been used for what was at times the Ehrenliga Saarland, the Amateurliga Saarland and, from 1978, the Verbandsliga Saarland. The new league however carries its name officially and is not known by any other name.

Overview
The league was introduced after a decision made by the Saarland Football Association on 31 May 2008. It was decided that the new league would be operating from the 2009-10 season onwards and slotted in between the tier-five Oberliga Südwest and, from then on,  the tier-seven Verbandsliga Saarland. The Verbandsliga remains as a single-division competition, which is unusual for the German football pyramid, where most leagues have two to three feeder leagues below itself.

To qualify for the new league, a club had to finish within the following specifications at the end of the 2008-09 season:
 All Saarland clubs relegated from the Oberliga Südwest (V) qualify.
 The clubs placed second to seventeenth in the Verbandsliga Saarland (VI) qualify. The Verbandsliga winner earns promotion to the Oberliga. 
 The two Landesliga (VII) champions qualify.

As the number of clubs relegated from the Oberliga from Saarland was not known at the time this system was decided on, it was determined that for every team relegated, one fewer from the Verbandsliga would qualify. In this case, the SV Mettlach having been relegated, the seventeenth club from the Verbandsliga would not gain entry to the new Saarlandliga. The clubs from the Verbandsliga not qualified for the new league were to remain in the Verbandsliga and would not suffer relegation to the Landesligas.

Modus
Eighteen teams are scheduled to compete in the league since 2009-10, with a home-and-away season format. The league winner is promoted to the Oberliga, while the two last placed teams are relegated to the Verbandsliga. In turn, the best two teams out of that league earn direct promotion to the Saarlandliga.

League champions
The league champions:

 In 2013–14 runner-up FV Diefflen was also promoted. 
 In 2017–18 TuS Herrensohr declined promotion; runner-up VfB Dillingen was instead promoted.
 In 2019–20 runner-up FSV Jägersburg was also promoted.

Founding members
The following clubs qualified for the new league, according to the above system:

 From the Oberliga Südwest
 SV Mettlach
 From the Landesligas Saarland
 Borussia Neunkirchen II
 VfB Dillingen

 From the Verbandsliga Saarland
 FSV Jägersburg
 FC Hertha Wiesbach
 SC Friedrichsthal
 SC Halberg Brebach
 1. FC Saarbrücken II
 SV Röchling Völklingen
 FV Eppelborn
 1. FC Riegelsberg
 FC Reimsbach
 SG Perl/Besch
 SV Bübingen
 FSV Hemmersdorf
 FC Palatia Limbach
 VfB Hüttigweiler
 SC Gresaubach

References

Sources
 Deutschlands Fußball in Zahlen,  An annual publication with tables and results from the Bundesliga to Verbandsliga/Landesliga. DSFS.
 Kicker Almanach,  The yearbook on German football from Bundesliga to Oberliga, since 1937. Kicker Sports Magazine
 Süddeutschlands Fussballgeschichte in Tabellenform 1897-1988  History of Southern German football in tables, by Ludolf Hyll
 Die Deutsche Liga-Chronik 1945-2005  History of German football from 1945 to 2005 in tables. DSFS. 2006.

External links 
 Das deutsche Fussball Archiv  Historic German league tables
 Saarland Football Association website  
 

Football competitions in Saarland
2009 establishments in Germany
Sports leagues established in 2009